The 2011 UEFA Women's Champions League Final was the final of the second season of the UEFA Women's Champions League and was held at Fulham's Craven Cottage in London, England, on 26 May 2011.

For the second year in a row, Lyon met Turbine Potsdam in the final. Unlike last year, Lyon came up with the victory as they defeated Potsdam 2–0 after goals from Wendie Renard and Lara Dickenmann. This was Lyon's first Champions League title. Television audience: 1,8 Million viewers on Direct 8, French Channel.

Route to the final

Match

Details

References 

Uefa Women's Champions League Final
Uefa Women's Champions League Final 2011
2011
May 2011 sports events in Europe
UEFA
UEFA
2011 sports events in London
UEFA Women's Champions League Final 2011